Camp Scott can refer to:
Camp Scott (Massachusetts), a Civil War camp
Camp Scott (Oklahoma), a closed Girl Scout camp
Camp Scott (Pennsylvania), a Civil War camp